The North Complex Fire was a massive wildfire complex that burned in the Plumas National Forest in Northern California in the counties of Plumas and Butte. 21 fires were started by lightning on August 17, 2020; by September 5, all the individual fires had been put out with the exception of the Claremont and Bear Fires, which merged on that date, and the Sheep Fire, which was then designated a separate incident. On September 8, strong winds caused the Bear/Claremont Fire to explode in size, rapidly spreading to the southwest. On September 8, 2020, the towns of Berry Creek and Feather Falls were immediately evacuated at 3:15 PM PDT with no prior warning, By September 9, 2020, the towns of Berry Creek and Feather Falls had been leveled, with few homes left standing. The fire threatened the city of Oroville, before its westward spread was stopped. The fire killed 16 people and injured more than 100. Among the 16 fatalities was a 16-year-old boy. The complex burned an estimated , and was 100% contained on December 3. The fire was managed by the U.S. Forest Service in conjunction with Cal Fire, with the primary incident base in Quincy. The North Complex Fire was the sixth-largest in California's modern history, and the deadliest fire in the 2020 California wildfire season.

Events
On August 17, 2020, dry thunderstorms sparked 21 wildfires in the Plumas National Forest and Lassen National Forest, the largest of which were the Claremont and Bear Fires along the canyon of the Middle Fork Feather River. The storms came from a large plume of moisture from Tropical Storm Fausto that were carried into California, which started hundreds of wildfires simultaneously across Northern and Central California. By August 22, 16 of the original 21 fires had been contained. The Sheep Fire near Susanville was originally included as part of the North Complex, but on September 5, it was assigned to a separate incident.

Claremont Fire
The Claremont Fire was spotted around 9:00 AM PDT on August 17. The fire originated along Claremont Creek, a tributary of the Middle Fork just south of Quincy, and quickly jumped the ridge northwards towards American Valley. On August 20 an evacuation advisory was issued for East Quincy which was quickly changed to a mandatory evacuation for East Quincy and residents along Quincy-La Porte Road. On August 22 the fire jumped California State Route 70 at the Massack Rest Area southeast of Quincy. On August 23, aided by high winds, the fire began advancing rapidly east forcing Spring Garden and Greenhorn to be evacuated. The fire threatened State Route 70 and the Union Pacific Railroad tracks, shutting both down intermittently for several days.

Mandatory evacuations were lifted in East Quincy, but with continued strong west winds, Greenhorn and Sloat to the east were evacuated on August 28. On August 30 crews conducted backfire operations on the eastern side of the fire and prevented it from spreading towards Spring Garden and Cromberg. On September 1 mandatory evacuations were lifted for Quincy-La Porte Road. On September 5, with fire activity much lower on the eastern sides, evacuation orders were lifted for Spring Garden, Greenhorn, Sloat and Cromberg.

Bear Fire

The Bear Fire was also spotted around 9:00 AM on August 17, in the Middle Fork canyon west of the Claremont Fire near the Pacific Crest Trail. The fire started in rough, roadless country along the Wild and Scenic section of the Middle Fork. An effort was made to staff the fire on August 18, but an increase in fire activity forced fire crews to withdraw. After that point, because of limited firefighting resources, the Bear Fire was left unstaffed because it wasn't immediately a threat to people or property, it was in steep, rugged terrain, and resources were scarce due to the fires burning across the state. Efforts were concentrated on the Claremont Fire. On August 26, some areas around Bucks Lake were placed under evacuation advisory due to increased fire activity on the Bear Fire. Crews also were working on containment line to the northeast as the fire expanded slightly towards Quincy.

September 5–December 3
While crews concentrated on structure protection and building containment line around the perimeter of the fires, the unpopulated area between the Claremont and Bear fires was allowed to burn naturally with the help of backfiring operations, and the two fires merged on September 5, at a combined . A total of 1,386 personnel were assigned to the fire. The southern boundary of the fire was mostly held along the Middle Fork, and crews worked to build secondary containment lines south of the river. Flames crossed the river in a few areas but were quickly contained.

On the morning of September 8 a dry cold front moved in, bringing strong northeast winds and threatening the incomplete containment line along the river. At about 10:00 AM, the fire jumped the river near Horshoe Bend and began heading rapidly southwest. At 11:50 AM, mandatory evacuations were issued for La Porte and Little Grass Valley Reservoir. As winds picked up throughout the day, evacuation orders were issued by 3:25 PM for several communities in Butte County including Feather Falls, Clipper Mills, Berry Creek, Brush Creek, Woodleaf and Forbestown, and around Miners Ranch Road and California State Route 162. Evacuation orders were also effective in Yuba County for residents along La Porte Road, New York Flat Road, and around Brownsville and New Bullards Bar Reservoir. At 11:00 PM PDT, Kelly Ridge and Copley Hills, near Lake Oroville, were evacuated, as officials predicted strong winds would lead to continuing extreme fire behavior.

On the early morning of September 9, evacuation warnings were issued for more areas around Lake Oroville, Concow and Paradise and in Plumas County, a mandatory evacuation order was issued for Bucks Lake and an evacuation advisory for Meadow Valley. As predicted, high winds continued to drive the fire rapidly downhill and southwest, traveling  to Lake Oroville in a few hours, threatening the city of Oroville. The entire town of Berry Creek was destroyed, with only 3 houses left standing in the town of 1,200. Homes were also burned in several nearby communities, such as Feather Falls. Daniel Swain, a climate scientist at University of California Los Angeles, compared the explosive wind-driven spread with the 2018 Camp Fire, which occurred just north of this area.

At 4:00 PM PDT on September 9, the fire had jumped the southern arm of the lake and was burning in the hills above Oroville. It had also traveled as far west as the North Fork Feather River, threatening Paradise, although the burn scar from the Camp Fire slowed fire activity. On the south, the fire reached the South Fork Feather River, burning around the north side of Little Grass Valley Reservoir and approaching Forbestown. The city of Oroville and surrounding foothill communities were under an evacuation warning. As of 5:00 PM, at least three people were dead and twelve missing; at least 100 people were rescued. An estimated 2,000 buildings had been destroyed. On the evening of September 9, the fire was estimated at  24 percent containment.

On September 10, the section of the fire that had burned into the Cal Fire protection zone was labeled as the North Complex West Zone. The approximately  section mostly outside of the Plumas National Forest was managed by Cal Fire. On September 10 authorities reported the number of confirmed deaths had increased to ten, and 16 people were reported missing. Due in part to a reversal of wind direction, the fire did not burn significantly more acreage on September 10.

By September 11, winds had shifted to the southwest, blowing the fire front and smoke back over the burn area and towards Quincy. Fire activity was significantly decreased from the previous day, allowing crews to work on containment lines protecting homes around Bucks Lake and Little Grass Valley Reservoir. A total of 3,282 personnel were assigned to the fire.

Containment was increased to 38 percent. On September 15 continued southwest winds caused the fire to jump containment lines near Red Mountain, moving northeast towards Bucks Lake. On September 16 high fire activity continued near Red Mountain, with spot fires starting in the Grizzly Lake area. The fire was also active and growing in Onion Valley south of Quincy. In the meantime, firefighters made progress on containment lines along the southeast flank of the fire, between Sly Creek Reservoir and Little Grass Valley Reservoir.

On the morning of September 17, evacuation orders were issued for Meadow Valley and Tollgate as fire activity continued to pick up on the north side. By September 18, firefighters had extended containment lines up from Sly Creek Reservoir to Onion Valley. The spot fire at Grizzly Lake was contained, but not before burning . On September 22, the North Complex reached , and was 75 percent contained. Most of the growth had occurred on the northwest side of the fire as it continued to expand towards Bucks Lake.

On September 27, strong sustained winds picked up once again, starting spot fires outside of containment lines, including one on French Hotel Creek. An evacuation order was issued for Pulga, Concow, Big Bend and Yankee Hill as the fire moved west towards the North Fork Feather River Canyon. By the morning of September 29, the fire was within a few hundred yards of Highway 70, which was closed between Greenville Wye (west of Quincy) and Cherokee Road (east of Oroville).

On December 3,  the North Complex was declared 100% contained at 318,935 acres.

Smoke

Smoke from the fire created extremely unhealthy air conditions in Quincy and nearby communities for several weeks. After the fire grew explosively in size on September 9, smoke reached the Sacramento Valley and the San Francisco Bay area with ash falling from the sky between Danville, San Jose, and San Francisco.

Political response

On September 11, Governor Newsom visited the North Complex to talk about climate change and signed AB2147 into law, which allows former inmate firefighters to pursue a professional career in firefighting. He utilized the opportunity for social media.

His message was not well received by elected officials from the north state who, like the local media, were not invited to attend. The U.S. representative for district, Doug LaMalfa, responded: "Our people are suffering, The North Complex fires have raged in Butte, Plumas and Yuba counties, displacing thousands of families, burning down homes, taking the lives of 10 people, and injuring many more. Today, the governor had the audacity to come tour the North Complex and peddle his climate change agenda while offering zero solutions to alleviate the pain of our people or get these fires under control. He used our destroyed land for a photo op while systematically excluding every local voice, including our sheriffs, first responders, local press, elected officials, and others on the ground."

See also 

 2020 California wildfires

References

External links

North Complex Fire Incident Overview 
National Fire Situation Awareness (interactive map)

2020 California wildfires
Articles containing video clips
Wildfires in Plumas County, California
Wildfires in Butte County, California
August 2020 events in the United States